The Cologuard Classic is a professional golf tournament on the PGA Tour Champions. It debuted in 2015 at the Catalina Course of Omni Tucson National, in Tucson, Arizona.

The Tucson Open was a fixture on the PGA Tour for over six decades, from 1945 through 2006, and was often held at the Catalina Course, which opened in 1961. Tucson hosted the WGC-Accenture Match Play Championship for eight years in nearby Marana, from 2007 through 2014.

Course
Omni Tucson National Resort, Catalina Course

Opened  in 1961, the Catalina Course was designed by Robert Bruce Harris, and redesigned in 1983 by Robert Van Hagge and Bruce Devlin. Holes No. 7 and 8 were relocated and redesigned by Tom Lehman in 2005.

The fairways are Tifway 419 pollen-free Bermuda grass, over-seeded with winter rye; the greens are Champion Bermuda.

Winners

References

External links

Coverage on the PGA Tour Champions's official site
Tucson Conquistadores – official site

PGA Tour Champions events
Golf in Arizona
Sports in Tucson, Arizona
Events in Tucson, Arizona
Recurring sporting events established in 2015
2015 establishments in Arizona